The 2016 Epping Forest District Council election took place on 5 May 2016 to elect members of Epping Forest District Council in England. This was on the same day as other local elections.

This election saw the most seats won by the Loughton Residents Association winning 13 out of 14 Loughton seats, barring one seat in Loughton Roding where long-term incumbent Stephen Murray sits.

Ward results
Detailed below are all of the candidates nominated to stand in each ward in the upcoming election:

Buckhurst Hill East

Buckhurst Hill West

Chigwell Row

Chigwell Village

Epping Hemnall

Epping Lindsay & Thornwood Common

Grange Hill

High Ongar, Willingdale and the Rodings

Loughton Alderton

Loughton Broadway

Loughton Fairmead

Loughton Forest

Loughton Roding

Loughton St. John's

Loughton St. Mary's

Moreton & Fyfield

Passingford

Theydon Bois

Waltham Abbey Honey Lane

Waltham Abbey North East

Waltham Abbey South West

References

2016 English local elections
2016
2010s in Essex